Matthew Wilkinson (born 16 November 1985) is a British and South African former competitive figure skater. He competed for South Africa until 2000 and then switched to the United Kingdom. He qualified to the free skate at the 2002 World Junior Championships in Hamar, Norway, and at the 2004 World Junior Championships in The Hague, Netherlands. He became the 2003 British national bronze medalist.

Wilkinson switched back to South Africa in the 2004–05 season. He is the 1999 South African junior national champion and 2006 senior national champion. He withdrew from the 2007 South African nationals.

Programs

Results

References

External links 
 

British male single skaters
South African male single skaters
1985 births
Living people
Sportspeople from London